Henry Alexander Hagenauer (7 November 1878 – 29 July 1949) was an Australian rules footballer who played with Melbourne in the Victorian Football League (VFL).

Notes

External links 

Henry Hagenauer at Demonwiki

1878 births
Australian rules footballers from Victoria (Australia)
Melbourne Football Club players
1949 deaths
People educated at Geelong College